Kim Hyun-Seung (born November 16, 1984) is a South Korean football player who since 2008 has played for Gwangju Sangmu FC.

References

1984 births
Living people
Association football midfielders
South Korean footballers
Suwon Samsung Bluewings players
Gimcheon Sangmu FC players
K League 1 players